R. S. Bharathi is an Indian politician from the state of Tamil Nadu and belongs to the Dravida Munnetra Kazhagam. He is a lawyer by profession.

In June 2016, he was announced as the party's candidate for the Rajya Sabha biennial polls. On 3 June 2016 he was elected unopposed along with T. K. S. Elangovan.

References

1947 births
Living people
Rajya Sabha members from Tamil Nadu
Dravida Munnetra Kazhagam politicians